Işılay Saygın (April 4, 1947 – July 26, 2019) was a Turkish architect, politician, and four-time government minister between 1995 and 1999.

İşilay Saygın was born to Osman Nuri Saygın and his wife Fatma in Buca district of İzmir Province, western Turkey. She graduated from Faculty of Architecture at Ege University.

Saygın entered politics in 1973 from the Justice Party (AP) and served two terms as district mayor of her hometown. Her post ended in 1980 after the military coup that year. She then worked as an architect until she returned to politics in 1983 joining the Nationalist Democracy Party (MDP). With the 1983 election, Saygın entered the parliament in its 17th term as a deputy of İzmir. In the following elections of 1987, 1991, 1995 and 1999, she kept her seat in the parliament. After the dissolution  of the MDP in 1986, she joined the Motherland Party (ANAP) in 1987 In 1995, she moved to the True Path Party (DYP). In 1997, she returned to her former party ANAP. She was politically active until 2003.

Saygın was appointed four times as a government minister. She became the Minister of State responsible for "Women and Family Affairs" in the 51st government led by female Prime Minister Tansu Çiller succeeding Aysel Baykal, and served between October 5 and October 30, 1995. She continued in her post in the 52nd government led by Çiller until February 23, 1996, replaced by İmren Aykut. The same day, she was appointed Minister of Environment succeeding Ahmet Hamdi Üçpınarlar. On March 6, 1996, Mustafa Taşar took over her office. Prime minister Mesut Yılmaz appointed her the same day Minister of Tourism in the 53rd government. She held the office until June 28, 1996. Saygın took again office of the Minister of State on the same day serving in the 54th government led by Necmettin Erbakan and the 55th government led Mesut Yılmaz until January 11, 1999.

In January 1998, as she was holding the office of Minister of State in charge of "Women and Family Affairs", Saygın was criticized when she defended the practice of virginity testing in an interview she gave to a daily. Feminists demanded her resignation.

References

External links
 Personal website

2019 deaths
1947 births
People from Buca
Ege University alumni
Turkish architects
Women mayors of places in Turkey
Mayors of places in Turkey
Deputies of Izmir
Ministers of State of Turkey
Members of the 51st government of Turkey
Members of the 52nd government of Turkey
Members of the 53rd government of Turkey
Members of the 54th government of Turkey
Members of the 55th government of Turkey
Ministers of Environment of Turkey
Ministers of Tourism of Turkey
Women government ministers of Turkey
Government ministers of Turkey
Members of the 17th Parliament of Turkey
Members of the 18th Parliament of Turkey
Members of the 19th Parliament of Turkey
Members of the 20th Parliament of Turkey
Members of the 21st Parliament of Turkey
Justice Party (Turkey) politicians
Nationalist Democracy Party politicians
Motherland Party (Turkey) politicians
Democrat Party (Turkey, current) politicians
20th-century Turkish women politicians